Zirka may refer to:

 Zirka, a village in Bashkortostan, Russia
 , a village in Donetsk Oblast, Ukraine
 , a village in Zaporizhzhia Oblast, Ukraine